ELAN is an interpreted educational programming language for learning and teaching systematic programming.

It was developed in 1974 by C.H.A. Koster and a group at the Technical University of Berlin as an alternative to BASIC in teaching, and approved for use in secondary schools in Germany by the "Arbeitskreis Schulsprache". It was in use until the late 1980s in a number of schools in Germany, Belgium, the Netherlands, and Hungary for informatics teaching in secondary education, and used at the Radboud University Nijmegen in the Netherlands for teaching systematic programming to students from various disciplines and in teacher courses.

The language design focuses strongly on structured programming, and has a special construction for stepwise refinement, allowing students to focus on top-down design, and bottom-up coding.

The microkernel operating system Eumel began as a runtime system (environment) for ELAN.

See also
ALGOL 68

External links
ELAN implementation built by the Radboud University Nijmegen
ELAN implementation download site
Dresden uni on ELAN

Educational programming languages
Algol programming language family
Computer-related introductions in 1974
Procedural programming languages
Programming languages created in 1974
Programming languages